"Run to Me" is a song by American R&B singer Angela Winbush. The song is the second single from Angela Winbush's solo debut album, Sharp. The single reached number four on the Billboard R&B chart, following her debut single, "Angel", which spent two weeks at the top of the chart. The singles music video was choreographed by singer Paula Abdul, who is also featured as a dancer in the video.

A video for "Run to Me" was released as a download on iTunes in May 2007. It is also part of YouTube's music video program with Universal Records .

Track listing
A1."Run to Me" (Club Remix) - 5:55
A2."Run to Me" (LP Version) - 4:47
B3."Run to Me" (7" Version) - 3:42
B4."Run to Me" (12" Dub Remix) - 6:15

Remixes produced by Bruce Forest and Frank Heller.

Charts

References

External links
"Run to Me" - Angela Winbush

Angela Winbush songs
1987 singles
Songs written by Angela Winbush
1987 songs
PolyGram singles
Dance-pop songs